|}

This is a list of electoral district results for the Victorian 1973 election.

Results by electoral district

Albert Park

Ballarat North

Ballarat South

Balwyn

Bellarine

Benalla

Benambra

Bendigo

Bennettswood

Bentleigh

Box Hill

Brighton

Broadmeadows

Brunswick East

Brunswick West

Camberwell

Caulfield

Coburg

Dandenong

Deer Park

Dromana

Dundas

Essendon

Evelyn

Footscray

Frankston

Geelong

Geelong North

Gippsland East

Gippsland South

Gippsland West

Gisborne

Glenhuntly

Glen Iris

Greensborough 

 This result was declared void and a by-election was held on 13 October 1973, in which Monte Vale retained this seat for the Liberal party.

Hampden

Hawthorn

Heatherton

Ivanhoe

Kara Kara

Kew

Lowan

Malvern

Melbourne

Mentone

Midlands

Mildura

Mitcham

Monbulk

Moonee Ponds

Moorabbin

Morwell

Murray Valley

Narracan

Northcote

Oakleigh

Polwarth

Portland

Prahran

Preston

Reservoir

Richmond

Ringwood

Rodney

St Kilda

Sandringham

Scoresby

Shepparton

Sunshine

Swan Hill

Syndal

Warrnambool

Williamstown

See also 

 1973 Victorian state election
 Members of the Victorian Legislative Assembly, 1973–1976

References 

Results of Victorian state elections
1970s in Victoria (Australia)